German Water is an album by the Bloomington, Indiana-based instrumental rock band Ativin, released in 1999.

Critical reception
Pitchfork deemed the album "brooding, introspective and powerful, even during the whisper-quiet moments."

Track listing
 "Thirteen Ovens" – 4:00
 "Fortune Telling Fish" – 3:25
 "Stations" – 6:28
 "Back at the Lab" – 4:18
 "Church of Astronauts" – 4:00
 "Modern Gang Reader" – 4:17
 "Meeting with the Center of the Earth" – 11:52

References

1999 albums
Instrumental rock albums
Secretly Canadian albums
Ativin albums